|}

The Bahrain Trophy is a Group 3 flat horse race in Great Britain open to three-year-old horses. It is run on the July Course at Newmarket over a distance of 1 mile and 5 furlongs (2,615 metres), and it is scheduled to take place each year in July.

History
The event was formerly known as the H & K Commissions Handicap contested over 1 mile, 6 furlongs and 175 yards. It became a Listed race in 1990.

The current name was adopted in 1991, having previously been used for a three-year-old fillies' handicap over 7 furlongs on the same card.

The race was cut to 1 mile and 5 furlongs in 2006. It was promoted to Group 3 status in 2009.

It is now held on the opening day of Newmarket's three-day July Festival meeting, and is often used as a stepping-stone towards the St Leger.

Records

Leading jockey since 1986 (7 wins):
 Frankie Dettori – Podrida (1989), Spring to Action (1993), Grey Shot (1995), Three Cheers (1997), Kite Wood (2009), Corsica (2010), Mr Singh (2015)

Leading trainer since 1986 (5 wins):
 John Gosden - Three Cheers (1997), Masked Marvel (2011), Shantaram (2012), Feel like Dancing (2013), Mr Singh (2015)

Winners since 1986

See also
 Horse racing in Great Britain
 List of British flat horse races

References

 Racing Post:

 galopp-sieger.de – Bahrain Trophy.
 ifhaonline.org – International Federation of Horseracing Authorities – Bahrain Trophy (2019).
 pedigreequery.com – Bahrain Trophy – Newmarket.

Flat races in Great Britain
Newmarket Racecourse
Flat horse races for three-year-olds